A list of films produced in Egypt in 1950. For an A-Z list of films currently on Wikipedia, see :Category:Egyptian films.

External links
 Egyptian films of 1950 at the Internet Movie Database
 Egyptian films of 1950 elCinema.com

Lists of Egyptian films by year
1950 in Egypt
Lists of 1950 films by country or language